Sumner is a south-western suburb in the City of Brisbane, Queensland, Australia.

Geography 

Sumner is split between residential use in the west and the large industrial estate Sumner Park in the east.

History 
The western part of the original land holdings that became the Centenary Suburbs were part of the Wolston Estate, consisting of 54 farms on an area of 3000 acres, offered for auction at Centennial Hall, Brisbane, on 16 October 1901. Wolston Estate is the property of M. B. Goggs, whose father obtained the land forty years previously in the 1860s and after whom Goggs Road is named. Only three of the farms sold at the original auction.

In 1879, the local government area of Yeerongpilly Division was created. In 1891, parts of Yeerongpilly Division were excised to create Sherwood Division becoming a Shire in 1903 which contained the area of Wolston Estate. In 1925, the Shire of Sherwood was amalgamated into the City of Brisbane.

Sumner was developed as part of the Hooker Centenary Project in 1959. It and the surrounding suburbs such as Jindalee are known as the Centenary Suburbs. It was officially named by the Queensland Government in 1969. The name came from Sumner Road, which marks the northern boundary. Sumner was a lawyer who visited his property at the end of Sumner Road on the weekends.

Centenary Memorial Gardens was established in 2001.

Parts of Sumner were flooded in the 2011 Brisbane floods.

The median age of the Sumner population was 29 years, 8 years below the Australian median. 61.6% of people living in Sumner were born in Australia, compared to the national average of 69.8%; the next most common countries of birth were New Zealand 5.4%, England 4.4%, Sri Lanka 3.5%, India 2.8%, South Africa 2%. 75.4% of people spoke only English at home; the next most popular languages were 2.6% Vietnamese, 2% Sinhalese, 1.8% Punjabi, 1.8% Arabic, 1.1% Maori (Cook Island).

Education 
There are no schools in Sumner. The nearest primary school is Middle Park State School in neighbouring Middle Park to the north-west. The nearest secondary school is Centenary State High School in Jindalee to the north-east.

Facilities
Centenary Memorial Gardens is a crematorium and cemetery on a  site at 353 Wacol Station Road.

Amenities
There are a number of parks in the area:

 Spine Street Park
 Wacol Station Road Park

 Wolston Road Park

References

External links

 ourbrisbane.com website, Sumner section

Suburbs of the City of Brisbane